Aurora Central High School is a high school in Aurora, Colorado. It was originally named Aurora High School and was the first high school in Aurora Public Schools. When Hinkley High School was built in 1963, this school was renamed to its present title. The first class to graduate from the existing location was the Class of 1956.

School shooting
On November 15, 2021 around 12:45 P.M., a shooting happened at a small park close to the high school. Six students from the school were shot with non–life threatening injuries. 30–50 shots were fired from people in a car and from people on foot.

Demographics
For the 2014-2015 school year, there were 2,188 students enrolled at Aurora Central High School. The student body demographics were as follows:
 5% White
 67% Latino
 16% African American
 8% Asian
 1.4% Native American
 2% Two or More Races

Notable alumni
 Danny Jackson, former MLB player (Kansas City Royals, Cincinnati Reds, Chicago Cubs, Pittsburgh Pirates, Philadelphia Phillies, St. Louis Cardinals, San Diego Padres)
 Robert Michael Pyle, author, lepidopterist
Naquetta Ricks, businesswoman and member of the Colorado House of Representatives
 Michelle Waterson, professional mixed martial artist for the UFC's Strawweight division
 Don Young, former MLB player (Chicago Cubs)

References

External links 

Public high schools in Colorado
Aurora Public Schools (Colorado)
Educational institutions established in 1931
Schools in Arapahoe County, Colorado
1931 establishments in Colorado